The Dover and Statesboro Railroad was founded in 1889 and began operations between Statesboro, GA and Dover, GA.  It was acquired by the Central of Georgia Railway in 1901.

Defunct Georgia (U.S. state) railroads
Predecessors of the Central of Georgia Railway
Railway companies established in 1889
Railway companies disestablished in 1901
1889 establishments in Georgia (U.S. state)